Ginou Etienne (born 12 January 1985) is a track and field athlete who specialises in the 400 metres. She has competed both for the University of Miami and internationally on Haiti's behalf. Etienne was one of seven Haitian athletes who competed at the 2008 Summer Olympics. She also competed at the 2007 World Championships in Athletics.

References

All Athletics

Living people
1985 births
Haitian female sprinters
Competitors at the 2006 Central American and Caribbean Games
Pan American Games competitors for Haiti
Athletes (track and field) at the 2007 Pan American Games
Olympic athletes of Haiti
Athletes (track and field) at the 2008 Summer Olympics
World Athletics Championships athletes for Haiti
Miami Hurricanes women's track and field athletes
Olympic female sprinters